Igor Pashchenko is a paralympic athlete from Ukraine competing mainly in category T12 sprint events.

Igor Competed in the 100m and 200m at both the 2000 and 2004 Summer Paralympics winning the 100m bronze and silver in the 200m at the 2000 games, but unable to win any medals in 2004.

References

Paralympic athletes of Ukraine
Athletes (track and field) at the 2000 Summer Paralympics
Athletes (track and field) at the 2004 Summer Paralympics
Paralympic silver medalists for Ukraine
Paralympic bronze medalists for Ukraine
Living people
Medalists at the 2000 Summer Paralympics
Year of birth missing (living people)
Paralympic medalists in athletics (track and field)
Ukrainian male sprinters
Visually impaired sprinters
Paralympic sprinters